White Hall, also known as the William Cann Tenant House and Andrew Elliason Tenant House, is a historic home located at Bear, New Castle County, Delaware.  It was built in three phases during the 19th century between about 1830 and 1860, and is a two-story, five-bay frame dwelling with a gable roof. It has a -story rear wing that creates a "T" configuration. It is in a vernacular Greek Revival / Italianate-style.  Also on the property are a contributing frame dairy barn, a concrete block milk house, and a frame implement shed, all dated to the 1930s.

It was listed on the National Register of Historic Places in 1990.

References

Houses on the National Register of Historic Places in Delaware
Greek Revival houses in Delaware
Italianate architecture in Delaware
Houses in New Castle County, Delaware
National Register of Historic Places in New Castle County, Delaware